Magnesium (Mg) is a mineral found naturally in the human body and in animal and plant-based foods, beverages, dietary supplements, and some medicines such as laxatives. It is necessary for the functioning of every organ, for the makeup of teeth and bones, and for metabolic processes. Magnesium can not be produced by the human body, and can only be obtained through dietary means.

When the amount of magnesium levels in the blood falls below the normal level (1.3 to 2.1 mEq/L), a person is experiencing hypomagnesia, or magnesium deficiency. A majority of people surveyed in the United States report lower daily intakes of magnesium than what is recommended. Some groups are particularly likely to have inadequate magnesium levels including people with gastrointestinal diseases, people with type 2 diabetes, people with alcohol dependence, and older adults.

Low serum magnesium has been linked to depressive symptoms. Magnesium effects the Hypothalamic–pituitary–adrenal axis in the brain, which controls the stress response system and therefore, anxiety and depression. Tentative data indicate that oral magnesium supplementation may be effective for treating mild to moderate adult depression.

Although there is evidence suggesting inadequate dietary Mg as contributing to the cause of depression, independent clinical trials are needed to confirm the efficacy of Mg in treating depression.

Excessive magnesium intake from dietary supplements or medications can cause magnesium toxicity Magnesium can also interact negatively with several medication types, such as antibiotics and diuretics, so people taking medications regularly should consult with a healthcare provider before starting a magnesium supplement.

References

Depression
Treatment of depression